Abu'l Muzaffar Bahram al-Armani al-Hafizi was the vizier of the Fatimid Caliphate in 1135–1137, under the Caliph al-Hafiz li-Din Allah.

Sources

 , pp. 109–117
 
 
 
 
 

1140 deaths
12th-century Armenian people
12th-century people from the Fatimid Caliphate
Egyptian people of Armenian descent
Viziers of the Fatimid Caliphate
12th-century Christian monks
Date of birth unknown
Armenian Christians